George Bully is a 1920 German silent mystery film directed by Max Obal and starring Ernst Reicher as the detective Stuart Webbs, who was modeled on Sherlock Holmes.

Cast
 Ernst Reicher as Stuart Webbs, detective 
 Ludwig Götz 
 Stella Harf 
 Erwin Kalser 
 Arnold Marlé 
 Ferdinand Martini 
 Hermann Nesselträger 
 Theo Albert Wagner as George Bully

References

Bibliography
 Rainey, Buck. Serials and Series: A World Filmography, 1912-1956. McFarland, 2015.

External links

1920 films
Films of the Weimar Republic
Films directed by Max Obal
German silent feature films
German mystery films
German black-and-white films
1920 mystery films
Silent mystery films
1920s German films
1920s German-language films